Cristina Álvarez Rodríguez (born 28 December 1967) is an Argentine architect and politician, currently serving as Minister of Government and Infrastructure of Buenos Aires Province, under Governor Axel Kicillof. She was previously a National Deputy representing Buenos Aires Province from 2015 to 2021. A great-niece of Eva Perón, she belongs to the peronist Justicialist Party.

Education
Rodriquez was born in Buenos Aires on December 28, 1967. She got her degree in architecture in 1992 from the University of Buenos Aires Faculty of Architecture, Design and Urbanism. In 2002 she completed a master's degree in Photography from the University of Palermo.

Career
Rodriquez was appointed Director of the Historical Archives of the Province of Buenos Aires in 2000. A year later, she became President of the Institute of Social Welfare of the Province of Buenos Aires. In 2002 she became Secretary of Culture of the same province. She was chair of the Cultural Institute of Buenos Aires from 2003-2005. From 2005-2007 she served as President Ad-honorem of the Social Integration Council of the Government of the Province of Buenos Aires. That same year she was on the committees of Municipal Affairs, Culture, Natural Resources and Human Environment Conservation, Tourism. She was a committee member for two years. In 2005 she was also the Vice President of the Commission on Addiction Prevention and Control of Narcotics Chamber of Deputies. She won membership of the National Front for Victory in 2005. In 2007 she was appointed Minister of Tourism of the Government of the Province of Buenos Aires.

Electoral history

References

Living people
1967 births
Architects from Buenos Aires
21st-century Argentine women politicians
21st-century Argentine politicians
Members of the Argentine Chamber of Deputies elected in Buenos Aires Province
University of Buenos Aires alumni
University of Palermo (Buenos Aires) alumni
Argentine women architects